Louis Straight Clark (February 10, 1925 – February 10, 1995) was an American tennis player in the mid-20th century. He was born in Des Moines, Iowa. He played college tennis at the University of Southern California.

A member of the US Davis Cup team, he was 5–0 in matches in 1953 and 1954 (and the latter year, a member of the winning team).

Clark won the singles title in Monte Carlo in 1951 after a five-set win in the final against compatriot Fred Kovaleski. That same year he defeated Whitney Reed to reach the final of the Pennsylvania State tennis championship, only to fall to future Hall of Famer Vic Seixas. In 1952 he won the Western India Tennis Championships in Bombay against Władysław Skonecki.

In 1954, he won the singles title at the tournament in Cincinnati, defeating Sammy Giammalva, Sr., in the final in three straight sets.

He reached the final at the Newport Casino Invitational in 1954, only to lose to Ham Richardson in five sets, in a match that lasted more than four hours.

When he teamed with fellow American Hal Burrows, the pair became one of the top doubles teams of their time. They reached the finals of the U.S. Clay Court Championship, and the semifinals of the U.S. Nationals, upsetting the team of future International Hall of Famers Ken Rosewall and Lew Hoad in the quarterfinals. Clark and Burrows also reached the quarterfinals at the French National Championships, Rome and Wimbledon.

References

External links
 
 
 

American male tennis players
Sportspeople from Des Moines, Iowa
Tennis people from Iowa
1925 births
1995 deaths